Siethen is a village and a part of the city of Ludwigsfelde in the district of Teltow-Fläming in the federal state of Brandenburg. The name Siethen means "land of corn".

Demographics 
The village has a population of 600 inhabitants (2004), a size of 14,48 km² and is located 3 km in the west of the town Ludwigsfelde, to which Siethen has belonged for several years.

Facilities 
Siethen's church was erected in the 14th century; it is located in the village center Siethen has a small castle, built in the 19th century. It was later on used as a hospital and refugee camp.

External links 
 Webpage of the city of Ludwigsfelde
 Webpage of the farm "Spargelhof Siethen"
 Webpage of the holiday village "Maerkisches Wanderdorf"

Villages in Brandenburg
Localities in Teltow-Fläming